IGFRI, a national institute under the administrative control of Indian Council of Agricultural Research, is mandated to conduct Basic, strategic and adaptive research on improvement, production and utilization of fodder crops and grasslands; Coordination of research on forages and grasslands for enhancing productivity and quality for enhancing livestock productivity; Technology dissemination and human resource development. The Institute has highly experienced and internationally trained human resources engaged in need-led, participatory, inter-disciplinary approaches. With more than 50 years of experience in forage research and development, IGFRI today stands as the premier R&D institution in South Asia for sustainable agriculture through quality forage production for improved animal productivity.

History

The Indian Grassland and Fodder Research Institute, established in 1962, has been instrumental in fostering research, training and extension programmes on all aspects of forage production and utilization through inter-disciplinary approach. It has provided technologies, human resource development skills, consultancy and technical services on forage production and utilization to government and non-government organizations, agri-business and farmers. This has been possible due to the benign patronage and guidance of Dr. T. Mohapatra, Secretary DARE and Director General, ICAR, New Delhi. It has three regional stations to cater to forage related location specific R&D needs of humid tropics (at Dharwad), semi-arid and arid (at Avikanagar) and temperate (at Srinagar/ Palampur)

References 

Jhansi
Agricultural research institutes in Uttar Pradesh
Research institutes established in 1962
1962 establishments in Uttar Pradesh